Political criticism, also referred to as political commentary or political discussion, is a type of criticism that is specific of or relevant to politics, including policies, politicians, political parties, and types of government.

See also
Bad Subjects
Political communication
Political satire

Criticism
Criticism